Huilua Fishpond, in Ahupuaa O Kahana State Park on windward Oʻahu, is one of the few surviving ancient Hawaiian fishponds that were still operational well into the 20th century. It was declared a U.S. National Historic Landmark in 1962, shortly after it had been severely damaged by the 1960 tsunami. It was added to the National Register of Historic Places on December 29, 1962.

The fishpond may have started as a sandbar where ocean currents met the stream mouth. The name Huilua, which can be translated 'join-twice', may refer to the two gates. The favorite type of fish in the pond were amaama (flathead grey mullet), which reproduce in the ocean but can live in either fresh, brackish, or salt water.

Many Hawaiian fishponds were built between about the early 1400s and early 1600s. They were especially numerous in large expanses of shallow sea, such as Kāneʻohe Bay and Pearl Harbor. Each fishpond had a pondkeeper (kiai loko) who lived nearby and oversaw its maintenance. Sam Pua Haaheo was the pondkeeper for Huilua from 1924, just after the 1923 tsunami, until 1946, when another tsunami hit. The fishpond suffered further tsunami damage in 1957 and 1960. The most recent restoration work began in 1993 as a cooperative project between the State Park service and Friends of Kahana, an organization of local residents.

Gallery

References

National Historic Landmarks in Hawaii
Archaeological sites on the National Register of Historic Places in Hawaii
Bodies of water of Oahu
History of Oahu
Buildings and structures in Honolulu County, Hawaii
Tourist attractions in Honolulu County, Hawaii
Fishponds of Hawaii
Farms on the National Register of Historic Places in Hawaii
National Register of Historic Places in Honolulu County, Hawaii
Geography of Honolulu County, Hawaii